Tin Wu is an MTR Light Rail stop. It is located at ground level at the junction of Tin Wu Road and Tin Shing Road in Tin Shui Wai, Yuen Long District. It began service on 7 December 2003 and belongs to Zone 4. It serves Tin Shui Wai Sports Ground and Tin Shui Wai Sports Centre.

References

MTR Light Rail stops
Former Kowloon–Canton Railway stations
Tin Shui Wai
Railway stations in Hong Kong opened in 2003
2003 establishments in Hong Kong